Nordic combined at the 2002 Winter Olympics, consisted of three events held over ten days, from 9 February to 22 February. The ski jumping part took place in Park City, while the cross-country part took place in Soldier Hollow. This was the first Winter Olympics to have two individual Nordic Combined events: the 7.5 km individual normal hill (sprint) and the 15 km individual large hill (individual).

Medal summary

Medal table

Events

Participating NOCs

Fourteen nations participated in Nordic Combined at the Salt Lake Games.

References

External links
Official Results Book – Nordic combined

 
2002 Winter Olympics events
2002
2002 in Nordic combined
Nordic combined competitions in the United States
Men's events at the 2002 Winter Olympics